Lavis (Lavìs in local dialect) is a comune (municipality) in Trentino in the northern Italian region Trentino-Alto Adige/Südtirol, located about  north of Trento.

The municipality of Lavis contains the frazioni (subdivisions, mainly villages and hamlets) Pressano, Sorni and Nave San Felice. Lavis borders the following municipalities: Giovo, San Michele all'Adige, Nave San Rocco, Zambana, Trento and Terlago.

Twin towns – sister cities

Lavis is twinned with:
 Forchheim, Germany

Demographic evolution

Notable people 
Franco Nicolini mountain guide

References

External links
 Homepage of the city

Cities and towns in Trentino-Alto Adige/Südtirol